The Stadion Za Lužánkami is a closed stadium in Brno, Czech Republic. It was primarily used for football, and was the home ground of FC Zbrojovka Brno. It held up to 50,000 people.

The stadium was constructed between 1949 and 1953 and was the biggest stadium in Czechoslovakia during the 1960s and 1970s. Za Lužánkami holds the record for the highest attendance in the Czech First League, set in a match between Brno and Slavia Prague during the 1996–97 Czech First League season. It was closed in 2001 after 1. FC Brno moved to Městský fotbalový stadion Srbská. The club was forced to move, since the stadium did not meet the football association and FIFA criteria.

Plans for a reconstruction of the stadium, whereby the team of FC Zbrojovka Brno would return, were made,  but in June 2012 it was announced that, due to financial concerns, the proposed reconstruction was on hold.

The stadium fell into disrepair, with trees and bushes growing within it and homeless people living in the stands. FC Zbrojovka Brno captain, Petr Švancara, took it upon himself to try and restore the stadium in order that he could play a farewell game at Za Lužánkami. This effort expanded into a volunteer campaign, back by crowdfunding, to have the stadium ready to host a final game for Švancara. The project was a success, and on 27 June 2015 approximately 35,000 spectators watched two teams composed largely of former FC Zbrojovka Brno players play a match at Za Lužánkami.

FC Zbrojovka Brno's youth team currently train at the stadium, which is rented out to supporters group Verime Zbrojovce, and plans have been unveiled for a £40 million overhaul.

International matches
Stadion Za Lužánkami has hosted one friendly match of the Czech Republic national football team

References

Defunct football venues in the Czech Republic
Football venues in Czechoslovakia
Athletics (track and field) venues in Czechoslovakia
Czech First League venues
Buildings and structures in Brno
FC Zbrojovka Brno